The Indian Appropriations Act is the name of several acts passed by the United States Congress. A considerable number of acts were passed under the same name throughout the 19th and early 20th centuries, but the most notable landmark acts consist of the Appropriation Bill for Indian Affairs of 1851 and the 1851 Indian Appropriations Act.

1851 Act 
The 1851 Indian Appropriations Act allocated funds to move Western tribes onto Indian reservations where they would be protected and enclosed by the United States government. According to the federal government at that time, reservations were to be created in order to protect the Indians from increasing numbers of White Americans moving to the West. This act set the precedent for modern-day Indian reservations.

There are differing explanations as to why this act was instituted, one of which is that Indians' control of land and natural resources around the country was regarded as a serious potential threat to average independent Americans' expansionary and economic goals.

Another explanation is that due to the country's fixed amount of land, the previously unrestricted presence of the Natives' living under different tribal laws but outside the jurisdiction of American Law began to unintentionally, but naturally, conflict legally with the growing number of Americans settling on more and more lands. This quickly posed a potentially dangerous security and insurance concern for many enterprising Americans, and the federal government, responsible for protecting its own citizens, was expected to respond with a solution not known before and departing from that previously practiced by the British Empire.

The most utilized explanation originated in the 1830s, nearly two decades before the passing of this Act, when many Americans agreed with President Jackson theories conceptualized by President Thomas Jefferson in 1803, that Native Americans needed to be resettled westward for their own protection. As decided, Native Americans in the South were forced to move to the Great Plains, but by the 1850s, Americans began to move into that area as well. Thus, the federal government, acting on such exigency and on Americans' long-standing sentiments regarding the Indians, passed the Indian Appropriations Act of 1851, placing Native Americans on reservations given there were no other lands available for another forced relocation.

As a consequence, conflict in the Great Plains region was aggravated when settlers began to move into the final remaining land and  Native Americans had no place in which to be relocated.

1871 Act
According to the Indian Appropriation Act of March 3, 1871, no longer was any group of Indians in the United States recognized as an independent nation by the federal government. Moreover, Congress directed that all Indians should be treated as individuals and legally designated "wards" of the federal government. Before this bill was enacted, the federal government signed treaties with different Native American tribes, committing the tribes to land cessions, in exchange for specific lands designated to Indians for exclusive indigenous use as well as annual payments in the form of cash, livestock, supplies, and services. These treaties, which took much time and effort to finalize, ceased with the passage of the 1871 Indian Appropriation Act, declaring that "no Indian nation or tribe" would be recognized "as an independent nation, tribe, or power with whom the United States may contract by treaty." On the other hand, the statute also declared "no obligation of any treaty lawfully made and ratified with any such Indian nation or tribe prior to March 3, 1871, shall be hereby invalidated or impaired." Thus, it can be argued that this bill made it significantly easier for the federal government to secure lands that were previously owned by Native Americans.

1885 Act
After several attempts by the Oklahoman Boomers to enter Indian Territory, Congress passed the 1885 Act which allowed Indian tribes and individual Indians to sell unoccupied lands that they claimed to be their own.

1889 Act
After years of trying to open Indian Territory, President Grover Cleveland, on March 2, 1889, signed the 1889 Act which officially opened the Unassigned Lands to non-native settlers under tenets of the Homestead Act. On a side-note, Grover Cleveland signed the Act into law days before his successor, Benjamin Harrison, took over as President of the United States. However, under a section in this original act, those who entered these unassigned lands illegally, before their respective racing times as designated in the President's opening proclamation, would be denied the rights to the lands they claimed. These people were termed "Sooners," with this section of the act being termed as the "sooner clause." But there was growing political pressure to open these unassigned lands to settlement quickly. Thus, later in 1889, an amendment to the Indian Appropriations Act allowed President Benjamin Harrison to be involved in this historical bill as well, proclaiming unassigned lands were open for settlement under much less stringent rules.

See also
 Cherokee Commission
 Dawes Act
 Indian Peace Commission
 Medicine Lodge Treaty
 Treaty of Fort Laramie (1868)

References

External links
 
 
 
 

1851 in American law
1885 in American law
1889 in American law
Pre-statehood history of Oklahoma
Native American history of Oklahoma
1890s in Oklahoma Territory
1880s in Oklahoma Territory
United States federal appropriations legislation